Sichuan Food is a Sichuan cuisine restaurant in Amsterdam, Netherlands. It was a fine dining restaurant that was awarded one Michelin star in 1993 and retained that rating until 2005.

The Michelin star awarded in 1993 was the first one awarded to a Chinese restaurant in the Netherlands. According to Reguliers.net it was also the first Chinese restaurant in Europe to receive a Michelin star.

In 2013, GaultMillau awarded Sichuan Food 11 points out of 20.

See also
 List of Chinese restaurants
List of Michelin starred restaurants in the Netherlands

References 

Restaurants in Amsterdam
Michelin Guide starred restaurants in the Netherlands
Chinese restaurants
Sichuan cuisine